Robert Karl "Deke" Edler (August 29, 1897 – June 1, 1953) was an American football player and coach. He played for one season for the Cleveland Indians of the National Football League (NFL), in 1923. Edler served as the head football coach at Otterbein College—now known as Otterbein University—from 1929 to 1934, compiling a record of 21–24–4.

Head coaching record

Football

References

External links
 
 

1897 births
1953 deaths
American football halfbacks
Basketball coaches from Ohio
Cleveland Indians (NFL) players
Heidelberg Student Princes football coaches
Ohio Wesleyan Battling Bishops football players
Otterbein Cardinals football coaches
Otterbein Cardinals men's basketball coaches
People from Galion, Ohio
Players of American football from Ohio